Route 139 is a highway in northern and central Missouri.  Its northern terminus is at the Iowa state line where it continues as Wayne County Route S40; its southern terminus is at U.S. Route 24 east of Carrollton.

Major intersections

References

139
Transportation in Carroll County, Missouri
Transportation in Livingston County, Missouri
Transportation in Chariton County, Missouri
Transportation in Linn County, Missouri
Transportation in Sullivan County, Missouri
Transportation in Grundy County, Missouri
Transportation in Putnam County, Missouri